David James Connolly (born 6 June 1977) is a retired professional footballer who played as a striker. He played for various clubs including Feyenoord and Excelsior in the Netherlands as well as Wigan Athletic and Sunderland in the Premier League. Born in England, Connolly represented the Republic of Ireland national team at international level. He was a member of Ireland's 2002 FIFA World Cup squad that lost to Spain in the knockout stage where his penalty kick was saved by Iker Casillas during the shootout.

Club career
Connolly started his career with Watford where he scored 15 goals in 34 games.
His goal scoring record, at club and international level, which included a hat-trick in World Cup qualifying, earned him a move to Dutch team Feyenoord Rotterdam. He had loan spells at Excelsior Rotterdam and Wolverhampton Wanderers (where he scored four goals in one game against Bristol City) before joining Wimbledon in 2001 on a free transfer where he scored 42 goals in two seasons.

Manager Glenn Roeder signed Connolly for West Ham United for £285,000 in August 2003. Connolly scored on his West Ham debut in a 2–1 away win at Preston North End on 9 August 2003. He scored 14 goals in 48 games in all competitions for West Ham; his final game coming in the 2004 play-off final defeat to Crystal Palace in May 2004.

Connolly signed for Leicester City in 2004 for £500,000, finishing as the club's top scorer in his first season. He managed a hat-trick against Stoke City in August 2005, prior to signing for Wigan.

On 31 August 2005, he joined newly promoted Premiership club Wigan Athletic for £2 million (with the possibility of rising to £3 million if Wigan stayed in the Premiership, which they did). He scored on his debut for Wigan in a 2–1 win at West Bromwich Albion, but was hit by injuries for much of the rest of the 2005–06 season. and Leeds in the FA Cup.

In 2006, also on 31 August, Connolly linked up with his former Republic of Ireland teammate Roy Keane at Sunderland. His first goal came against Colchester United on 18 November, when he came on as a sub and smashed the ball in off the post from about 18 yards out. Connolly ended up Sunderland's top scorer and was an integral part of their promotion in the 2006–07 season, scoring 13 goals in the campaign and scoring the final goal of the season for Sunderland against Luton Town on 6 May 2007, in the match that made Sunderland champions of the Championship.

In the 2007–08 season, Connolly played just five games, three of them in the league. In the 2008–09 season, Connolly did not make a single appearance. He was released on 28 May 2009.

After being released by Sunderland in the summer of 2009 he became a free agent. On 8 October 2009, Connolly signed a deal with League One side Southampton, lasting until the end of the 2009–10 season but capable of being extended by a further year if he hits an undisclosed number of appearances. He scored on his debut on 17 October 2009 against Oldham Athletic, and grabbed another in the next game against Milton Keynes Dons, once again off the bench. He scored two in the FA Cup first round tie against Bristol Rovers, in a 3–2 victory, his first start. Connolly's contract was then extended for the 2010–11 season.

He struggled with injury in the 2010–11 season, but scored in an FA Cup match against Shrewsbury Town, and then scored a crucial goal in a 2–1 victory away at champions Brighton. He followed that up with a goal in a 3–0 win at Brentford and then on the final day of the season in a 3–1 win over Walsall to end the season with four goals from 18 appearances in an injury-hit season. It was Connolly's late season form that helped Southampton clinch promotion. He also signed a new one-year deal with Saints.

Following Southampton's promotion to the Championship, Connolly continued his goal scoring form into the 2011–12 season by scoring the final goal in Southampton's 3–1 victory over Leeds United in the first game of the season. He then netted the only goal in a 1–0 victory at Barnsley a week later. On 16 August, he scored against Ipswich Town at Portman Road as Saints won 5–2, with the third of the night making the score 3–0 to Southampton at half time. This result firmly planted Southampton on top of the Championship table with three wins from their first three matches. Connolly scored again for Southampton against Leicester City on 27 August, but this was not enough to prevent the Saints from slipping to their first defeat of the season, losing 3–2. However, in January 2012, after the arrivals of Billy Sharp and Tadanari Lee, Connolly lost his place in the starting eleven, and was released at the end of the season.

On 31 December 2012, Connolly signed a one-month contract with Portsmouth. He made his debut a day later, against Swindon Town. He scored his first goal for Pompey on 26 February, against Milton Keynes Dons. He scored his second goal on 2 March, in a 2–1 win against Crewe Alexandra. On 9 March, Connolly scored twice in a 2–0 win against Bury. He left the club by mutual consent on 15 January 2014.

Connolly joined Oxford United on 31 January 2014 – deadline day – until the summer. He scored on his debut against AFC Wimbledon, after coming on as a 46th-minute substitute. His goal against Hartlepool on 21 March 2014 at the age of 36 years, 9 months and 15 days made him the club's oldest scorer to date.

On 15 January 2015 Connolly joined AFC Wimbledon, becoming the sixth player (the others being Jermaine Darlington, Marcus Gayle, Jason Euell, Roger Joseph and Neil Sullivan) to play for both the original Wimbledon and AFC Wimbledon. On 21 February 2015, during one of his final games with AFC Wimbledon, Connolly scored a late winner against local rivals Luton Town to win the game 3–2. On 7 March 2015, Connolly retired from playing.

International career
Connolly was a regular member of the Republic of Ireland national team, scoring nine goals in 41 caps.

He made his debut on 29 May 1996 against Portugal. He was sent off in 1997 after coming on as a substitute against Belgium in the play-off for a place at the 1998 FIFA World Cup, with Ireland losing by an aggregate score of 3–2.

Connolly was part of the 2002 FIFA World Cup squad that lost to Spain in the knockout stage, where his penalty kick was saved by Iker Casillas during the shootout. He scored for Ireland in Niall Quinn's benefit match on 14 May 2002, against his former club, Sunderland as well as once in Mick McCarthy's testimonial on 26 May 1996 against Celtic.

In the 2007–08 season Connolly failed to feature in any of Steve Staunton's squads, despite being Sunderland's top goalscorer, although he was called in to Giovanni Trapattoni's first 40-man squad in 2008 despite being injured at the time.

Career statistics

Club

International

Scores and results list the Republic of Ireland's goal tally first, score column indicates score after each Connolly goal.

Honours
Sunderland
Football League Championship: 2006–07

Southampton
Football League Trophy: 2010

See also
 List of Republic of Ireland international footballers born outside the Republic of Ireland

References

External links

Official Sunderland FC Profile
Career details at www.11v11.com

1977 births
Living people
Republic of Ireland association footballers
Republic of Ireland under-21 international footballers
Watford F.C. players
Feyenoord players
Wolverhampton Wanderers F.C. players
Excelsior Rotterdam players
Wimbledon F.C. players
West Ham United F.C. players
Leicester City F.C. players
Wigan Athletic F.C. players
Sunderland A.F.C. players
Southampton F.C. players
Premier League players
Eredivisie players
Eerste Divisie players
Republic of Ireland international footballers
2002 FIFA World Cup players
Republic of Ireland expatriate association footballers
Expatriate footballers in the Netherlands
Irish expatriate sportspeople in the Netherlands
British people of Irish descent
Footballers from Willesden
English Football League players
People educated at Burnham Grammar School
Portsmouth F.C. players
AFC Wimbledon players
Oxford United F.C. players
Association football forwards